Caladenia calcicola, commonly known as the Bats Ridges spider orchid, is a plant in the orchid family Orchidaceae and is endemic to a small area near the Victoria - South Australia border. It is a ground orchid with a single hairy leaf and one or two glossy, pale yellow flowers with maroon markings.

Description
The lateral sepals and petals are pale, glossy yellow with a red stripe down the centre. The petals are slightly shorter than the sepals and taper to a thin, pointed end. There are four or six rows of flattened calli along the centre of the flat part of the labellum. Flowering occurs from mid-September to early November.

Taxonomy and naming
The species was first formally described by Geoffrey Carr in 1986 and the description was published in Muelleria from a specimen collected near Portland. The specific epithet (calcicola) is derived from Latin words meaning "lime" and "dweller".

Distribution and habitat
This caladenia grows on low limestone ridges in a few areas west of Portland and a short distance into South Australia.

Conservation
Caladenia calcicola is classified as "vulnerable" under the Commonwealth Government Environment Protection and Biodiversity Conservation Act 1999 (EPBC) Act, as "Endangered" under the South Australian National Parks and Wildlife Act and as "Threatened" under the Victorian Government Flora and Fauna Guarantee Act 1988. The total population in 2007 was estimated to be less than 300. The main threats are grazing, quarrying activities and unsuitable fire regimes.

References

calcicola
Plants described in 1986
Endemic orchids of Australia
Orchids of South Australia
Orchids of Victoria (Australia)